William Hammond (30 January 1872 – 24 March 1935) was a British fencer. He competed at two Olympic Games. He was a three times British fencing champion, winning the sabre title at the British Fencing Championships in 1911, 1914 and 1921.

References

1872 births
1935 deaths
British male fencers
Olympic fencers of Great Britain
Fencers at the 1920 Summer Olympics
Fencers at the 1924 Summer Olympics
People from Purley, London